The Ruf CTR3 is a mid-engined sports car produced by German car manufacturer Ruf Automobile. The CTR3 was unveiled at the Bahrain International Circuit on the 20th anniversary of the original Ruf CTR on April 13, 2007 in conjunction with the opening of a new Ruf factory at the circuit.

Continuing the Ruf tradition of enhancing Porsche automobiles, the CTR3 shares the body style and engine type with the contemporaneous Porsche 987 Cayman and Porsche 997.1 Turbo. For the first time, however, it features a Ruf-designed body built on a dedicated platform engineered in conjunction with Multimatic and is particularly styled to reflect the visual feel of vintage Le Mans race cars of the 1950s and 1960s. Additionally, Ruf adopted the Porsche Cayman's mid-engine layout for the new car, rather than the traditional rear-engine layout of the previous CTR models (CTR and CTR2).

Specifications

Powertrain
The engine has a compression ratio of 9.2:1 and is controlled by a Bosch Motronic ECU.
The flat-six engine is paired with KKK K24 twin-turbochargers and two air-to-air intercoolers.

Transmission 
The CTR3 is equipped with a transversely mounted 6-speed sequential manual transmission. The transmission is paired with a limited-slip differential.

Chassis 
The CTR3 has a frame constructed from aluminum and zinc-dipped steel for the front and passenger sections of the car. The rear frame around the engine is a space frame constructed from billet aluminum by Multimatic that Ruf calls 'the Birdcage'. The body panels are made from a kevlar-carbon composite, and the car weighs  in total.

Suspension 
The CTR3 utilizes MacPherson strut suspension on the front axle from the Porsche 911, and multi-link suspension with horizontal coil over shock absorbers at the rear axle. Anti-roll bars are installed on both axles.

Wheels 
The CTR3 is equipped with forged aluminum wheels with diameters of 19 inches at the front and 20 inches at the rear. The tires are Michelin Pilot Super Sports with codes of 255/35 ZR 19 for the front and 335/30 ZR 20 for the rear. The brakes are ventilated ceramic composite discs, with a diameter of 380mm each and utilizing six-piston aluminium calipers at the front and rear.

CTR3 Clubsport

Ruf unveiled the CTR3 Clubsport variant at the 2012 Geneva Motor Show as an evolution and replacement of the standard CTR3. The Clubsport also introduced an optional 7-speed Dual-clutch transmission in addition to the standard 6-speed sequential manual. As of May 2018, only 7 CTR3 Clubsport cars have been built in addition to 30 standard CTR3 cars.

The CTR3 Clubsport shares many features with the Lykan HyperSport, a car developed from the same engine. Among these similarities are: engine (3.7L twin-turbo flat-six), transmissions (6-speed sequential manual and 7-speed PDK), suspension (MacPherson strut front and multi-link rear), wheels, tyres and brakes (255/35 ZR 19 for the front, 335/30 ZR 20 for the rear, 380mm carbon ceramic discs), weight (1,377 kg for the CTR3 and 1,380 kg for the Hypersport), and physical dimensions (height and length are within 35mm, wheelbase and width are identical at 2,625mm and 1,944mm respectively).

Performance

Gallery

References

External links
 Ruf CTR3 Official Page
 RUF Automobile - Worldwide Distributors

Coupés
Sports cars
Retro-style automobiles
CTR3
Rear mid-engine, rear-wheel-drive vehicles
Cars powered by boxer engines
Cars introduced in 2007
2010s cars